Michel Bouchonnet (born 17 July 1940) is a French gymnast. He competed at the 1964 Summer Olympics and the 1968 Summer Olympics.

References

1940 births
Living people
French male artistic gymnasts
Olympic gymnasts of France
Gymnasts at the 1964 Summer Olympics
Gymnasts at the 1968 Summer Olympics
Place of birth missing (living people)
20th-century French people